The discography of Disciple, which consists of 14 studio albums, 3 extended plays, 1 live extended play, 1 compilation album, and nine music videos.

Studio albums

EPs

Singles 
 "3-2-1", 2008 (from Southern Hospitality)
 "Whatever Reason", 2008 (from Southern Hospitality)
 "Romance Me", 2009 (from Southern Hospitality)
 "Right There", 2009 (from Southern Hospitality)
 "Lay My Burdens", 2009 (from Southern Hospitality)
 "Dear X (You Don't Own Me)", 2010 (from Horseshoes & Handgrenades)
 "Draw the Line", 2012 (from O God Save Us All)
 "Radical", 2014 (from Attack)
 "Erase", 2016 (from Long Live the Rebels)
 "God Is With Us", 2016 (from Long Live the Rebels)
 "Cuff the Criminal", 2019 (from Love Letter Kill Shot)
 "Panic Room (featuring Andrew Schwab)", 2019 (from Love Letter Kill Shot)
 "Play to Win", 2019 (from Love Letter Kill Shot)
 "Reanimate", 2019 (from Love Letter Kill Shot)
 "Darkness Dies," 2020 (from Love Letter Kill Shot (Deluxe))
 "The Executioner", 2023 (from Skeleton Psalms)
 "Promise to Live", 2023 (from Skeleton Psalms)

Special edition 
 Scars Remain: Special Edition
 Best of Disciple, 2005-2013
 Love Letter Kill Shot (Deluxe)

Music videos

Videography
 Live, at Home, and on the Road, 2004
 72 Hours with Disciple, 2001
 Dual Disc: "Day in the Life"
 LIVE 2012: 4 Nights In California 2012 (Download)

Compilation appearances
 WWE The Music, Vol. 8, 2008 "In The Middle Of It Now"
 X 2006, 2006 "The Wait is Over" (from Disciple)
 ConGRADulations! Class of 2006, 2006..."The Wait Is Over" (from Disciple)
 Isaiah 53:5: A Tribute to Stryper, 1999 "More than a Man" (from To Hell with the Devil by Stryper) 1340 Records
 J. P. Losman "The Wait Is Over" first start with the Buffalo Bills - NFL Videos

Notes

References 

Discographies of American artists
Christian music discographies